Ptyas korros, commonly known as the Chinese ratsnake or Indo-Chinese rat snake, is a species of colubrid snake endemic to Southeast Asia.

Description
Snout obtuse, projecting; eye very large. Rostral visible from above; internasals shorter than the prefrontals; frontal as long as its distance from the tip of the snout or a little longer, as long as the parietals; two or three loreals; a large preocular, sometimes touching the frontal; a small subocular below; two postoculars; temporals 2 + 2; eight upper labials, fourth and fifth entering the eye; five lower labials in contact with the anterior chin-shields, which are shorter than the posterior.

Dorsal scales smooth or feebly keeled on the posterior part of the body, in 15 rows at midbody; ventrals 160–177; anal divided; sub-caudals 122–145.

Brown or olive above; the scales on the posterior part of the body and on the tail often yellow and edged with black. Lower surface yellow. Young specimens with transverse series of round whitish spots or with narrow yellow transverse bars.

Length of head and  body  ; tail .

Distribution
Nepal, Myanmar; Cambodia, China (Zhejiang, Jiangxi, Fujian, Guangdong, Hainan, Guangxi, Hunan, Yunnan, Hong Kong), Taiwan, India (Assam; Manipur; Arunachal Pradesh (Namdapha - Changlang district, Chessa, Chimpu, Itanagar - Papum Pare district), Bangladesh, Indonesia (Sumatra, Borneo, Java, Bali), Laos, Thailand, Vietnam, West Malaysia and Singapore Island.

References

Further reading

 Ahsan, M. Farid, and Shayla Parvin. 2001. The first record of Ptyas korros (Colubridae) from Bangladesh. Asiatic Herpetological Research 9: 23–24.
 Jan, G., and F. Sordelli. 1867. Iconographie générale des Ophidiens: Vingt-quatrième livraison. Baillière. Paris. Index + Plates I.- VI. (Coryphodon korros, Plate IV., Figure 2.)
 Lazell, J.D. 1998. Morphology and the status of the snake genus Ptyas. Herpetological Review 29 (3): 134.
 Schlegel, H. 1837. Essai sur la physionomie des serpens. Partie Général xxviii + 251 pp. + Partie Descriptive 606 + xvi pp. Schonekat. Amsterdam.

External links
 
 Ptyas korros in Thailand

Colubrids
Reptiles of Bangladesh
Reptiles of China
Reptiles of India
Reptiles of Indonesia
Reptiles of Laos
Reptiles of Taiwan
Reptiles of Thailand
Reptiles of Malaysia
Reptiles of Vietnam
Taxa named by Hermann Schlegel
Reptiles described in 1837
Snakes of China
Snakes of Vietnam
Snakes of Asia
Reptiles of Borneo